Rafael Camiña (born 16 August 1944) is a Spanish field hockey player. He competed in the men's tournament at the 1968 Summer Olympics.

References

External links
 

1944 births
Living people
Spanish male field hockey players
Olympic field hockey players of Spain
Field hockey players at the 1968 Summer Olympics
Sportspeople from Getxo
Sportspeople from Biscay
Field hockey players from the Basque Country (autonomous community)